Antony Cotton  (born Antony Dunn; 5 August 1975) is an English actor, known for portraying the role of Sean Tully in Coronation Street, as well as portraying Alexander Perry in the original Queer as Folk series. In 2007, Cotton hosted his own talk show titled That Antony Cotton Show, which was cancelled after one series. In March 2013, he won Let's Dance for Comic Relief.

Early and personal life
Cotton was born Antony Dunn in Bury, Greater Manchester, the son of actress Enid Dunn. He attended Woodhey High School at Holcombe Brook, Ramsbottom, and the Oldham Theatre Workshop. He has an elder brother, Andrew. Cotton supports the Terrence Higgins Trust and is a patron of the LGF The Albert Kennedy Trust and the 'Queer Up North' festival.

In August 2009, it was reported in Digital Spy that Cotton is "openly gay". In March 2010, it was reported that Cotton had exchanged rings with his partner, Peter Eccleston. In January 2012, footballer Michael Ball was fined by the Football Association for a homophobic rant on Twitter about Cotton.

Career
Cotton currently plays barman and factory worker Sean Tully on Coronation Street, a role which he has continuously played since 2003. His Mother, Enid Dunn, also played several parts in Coronation Street between 2002 and 2014. Cotton played "Alexander" in the original UK version of Queer as Folk. He has also appeared in episodes of Absolutely Fabulous as "Damon". In 2007, Cotton won the second series of ITV's Soapstar Superstar. He donated his winning money, £200,000, to the Elton John Aids Foundation.

In July 2007, it was announced that Cotton would be fronting his own teatime chat show on ITV. The show, That Antony Cotton Show, was filmed with a live studio audience at Granada Television studios in Manchester, and combined celebrity chat with topical humour. It was first broadcast on 13 August 2007. Following the end of the first series, ITV announced that the show was axed and would not return for a second series. He appeared on Family Fortunes on 20 September 2008 winning £10,000 for his chosen charity. In December 2008, he appeared with co-star Suranne Jones on Who Wants to Be a Millionaire?.

He also took part in the eleventh series of I'm a Celebrity...Get Me Out of Here! which began airing on 13 November 2011. He left on 2 December 2011, after 21 days in the jungle, placing fourth. Cotton also starred in an episode of Mad Mad World on ITV1 in Spring 2012. He won first place in a series of Let's Dance for Comic Relief in March 2013. Cotton was a contestant for the 2018 revamp of Dancing on Ice.

Cotton made his film debut opposite Daniel Craig and Derek Jacobi in the 1998 film Love Is the Devil: Study for a Portrait of Francis Bacon. He also appeared in the 1998 film, The Wisdom of Crocodiles. Cotton has appeared in several shows at the Oldham Coliseum, including The Fifteen Streets and The Hobbit at Manchester's Palace Theatre and Opera House. He appeared in Snow White and the Seven Dwarfs at the Middlesbrough Theatre.

Honours, awards and recognition
In 2005, Cotton won the Most Popular Newcomer category at the National Television Awards for his role in Coronation Street. Cotton won the 2005 Inside Soap Awards for Best Newcomer and Funniest Performance. In 2006, he won the award for Funniest Performance. At the 2007 British Soap Awards, Cotton was awarded the Best Actor award, which was voted for by the public. Also in 2007 he won Best Actor at the Inside Soap Awards.

Cotton was appointed Member of the Order of the British Empire (MBE) in the 2022 Birthday Honours for services to the British Army, personnel and veterans.

Filmography
Film

Television

See also
 List of Dancing on Ice contestants
 List of I'm a Celebrity...Get Me Out of Here! (British TV series) contestants

References

External links

 

1975 births
Living people
English male soap opera actors
English LGBT actors
People from Bury, Greater Manchester
Singing talent show winners
English television talk show hosts
I'm a Celebrity...Get Me Out of Here! (British TV series) participants
21st-century English LGBT people
Members of the Order of the British Empire